The 2017 Geneva Open (also as known as the 2017 Banque Eric Sturdza Geneva Open for sponsorship reasons) was a men's tennis tournament played on outdoor clay courts. It was the 15th edition of the Geneva Open and part of the ATP World Tour 250 series of the 2017 ATP World Tour. It took place at the Tennis Club de Genève in Geneva, Switzerland, from May 21 through May 27, 2017.

Singles main draw entrants

Seeds 

 Rankings are as of May 15, 2017.

Other entrants 
The following players received wildcards into the singles main draw:
  Kei Nishikori
  Janko Tipsarević
  Stan Wawrinka

The following player received entry using a protected ranking:
  Tommy Robredo

The following players received entry from the qualifying draw:
  Daniel Altmaier 
  Roberto Marcora 
  Franko Škugor
  Mischa Zverev

The following player received entry as a lucky loser:
  Cedrik-Marcel Stebe

Withdrawals
Before the tournament
  Martin Kližan →replaced by  Dušan Lajović
  Lu Yen-hsun →replaced by  Horacio Zeballos
  Adrian Mannarino →replaced by  Stéphane Robert
  Viktor Troicki →replaced by  Cedrik-Marcel Stebe

Retirements
  Rogério Dutra Silva
  Janko Tipsarević

Doubles main draw entrants

Seeds

 Rankings are as of May 15, 2017.

Other entrants
The following pairs received wildcards into the doubles main draw:
  Johan Nikles /  Tim Pütz 
  João Sousa /  Constantin Sturdza

Withdrawals
Before the tournament
  Jan-Lennard Struff

During the tournament
  Rogério Dutra Silva
  Robert Lindstedt

Champions

Singles

  Stan Wawrinka def.  Mischa Zverev 4–6, 6–3, 6–3

Doubles

  Jean-Julien Rojer /  Horia Tecău def.  Juan Sebastián Cabal /  Robert Farah, 2–6, 7–6(11–9), [10–6]

References

External links 
 Official website

 
Geneva Open
Geneva Open
2017 in Swiss tennis
Geneva Open